Saanenmöser railway station (Bahnhof Saanenmöser) is a railway station at Saanenmöser Pass on the Montreux Oberland Bernois Railway line from  to . At , it is the highest station on the line. It is located in the municipality of Saanen, canton of Bern, Switzerland. An aerial cablecar at the station leads to Saanenwald-Saanerslochgrat.

References

Gallery

External links
 

Railway stations in the canton of Bern
Railway stations in Switzerland opened in 1873